Flight 544 may refer to:

Pakistan International Airlines Flight 544, hijacked on 25 May 1998
United Nations Flight 544, shot down on 21 December 2012

0544